Judge Jerrod & the Hung Jury is the third studio album by American country music singer Jerrod Niemann. It was released July 13, 2010 (see 2010 in country music) via Sea Gayle Music and Arista Nashville. It is his first major-label album, following two self-released albums and an unreleased compilation for Category 5 Records. The album contains the number-one single "Lover, Lover" and the top five hit "What Do You Want".

Critical reception
The album has received favorable reviews. Matt Bjorke of Roughstock gave the album four stars out of five, calling it "one of the most creative and fun albums to come out in 2010." Rating it three-and-a-half stars out of five, Jessica Phillips of Country Weekly said that it had "well-worn themes" in its songs, but that its sound was an "unpredictable mashup of styles." Rhapsody praised the album, calling it one of 2010’s most overlooked releases. Claiming that it disappeared beneath “the release-date-obsessed radar,” they deemed it one of the best albums released in the first half of the year. Writing for Allmusic, Stephen Thomas Erlewine gave it four stars out of five, praising the variety of sounds on the album but criticizing the presence of the comedy skits.

Track listing

Personnel
As listed in liner notes.

Musicians
Rachel Bradshaw – background vocals
Dave Brainard – background vocals, acoustic guitar, electric guitar, 12-string guitar, bass guitar, ukulele, keyboards, percussion, programming
Taryn Brainard – background vocals
Cliff Canterbury – bass guitar, background vocals
Will Doughty – piano, keyboards, Hammond B-3 organ
Dustin Evans – background vocals
Chris Hennessee – harmonica
Larissa Maestro – cello
David Mahurin – drums
Scott McQueary – electric guitar, acoustic guitar
Jerrod Niemann – lead vocals, background vocals, acoustic guitar, Wurlitzer electric piano, percussion, programming
Tim Teague – electric guitar, B-Bender guitar
Michael Tucker – djembe, percussion
Ashtyn Wallace – background vocals
Cole Wright – synthesizer

Skit performers
Melissa Baisden, Dave Brainard, Richie Brown, Dustin Evans, Sara France, David E. Gamble II, Julia Garlington, Perry Howard, Kristen Kutka, Tiffynee Mahurin, Jerrod Niemann, Dallas Rogers, Ashtyn Wallace, Cole Wright

Production
Dave Brainard – editing, overdubs, mixing, production
Tammie Harris Cleek – imaging, photoshoot production
Don Cobb – mastering
Eric Conn – mastering
Jeremy Coward – photography
Tracy Baskette Fleaner – creative director, package design
Judy Forde-Blair – liner notes, creative production
Robin Geary – grooming
Jennifer Kemp – stylist
Brian Kolb – mixing
David Kolb – tracking engineer
Scott McDaniel – creative direction
Jerrod Niemann – mixing, production

Chart performance
The album debuted at number one on the Billboard Top Country Albums chart, ending the 24-week Number One album reign of Lady Antebellum's Need You Now. It also became Niemann's first charting album on the Billboard 200 chart, debuting at number seven. As of the chart dated July 23, 2011, the album has sold 327,564 copies in the US.

Weekly charts

Year-end charts

Singles

References

2010 albums
Arista Records albums
Jerrod Niemann albums
Albums produced by Dave Brainard